AAPI may refer to:

 Asian Americans and Pacific Islanders (Asian Pacific Americans), an ethnic classification in the United States
 American Association of Physicians of Indian Origin
 Nazma Aapi (born 1999), the stage name of Indian comedian Saloni Gaur

See also
 Asian American and Pacific Islander Policy Research Consortium (AAPIPRC)